Guardian Bank, whose full name is Guardian Bank Limited, is a commercial bank in Kenya with headquarters in Nairobi. It is licensed by Central Bank of Kenya, the central bank and national banking regulator.

, the bank was a medium-sized retail bank, with an asset base totaling approximately KSh.16.186 billion/= ( million), and shareholders' equity of about KSh.2.557 billion/= ( million).  ranked Guardian, with a market share of 0.40%, the 26th largest Kenyan bank among 43 licensed financial institutions in its class.

History
Guardian Bank was established in 1992 as Euro Finance Limited, a non-bank financial institution. As a result of the changes in the banking laws of Kenya, Euro Finance Limited converted into a commercial bank in 1996 and rebranded to Guardian Bank Limited. In December 1999, the bank merged with Guilders International Bank Limited, keeping its current name, after the merger.

Ownership
The stock of Guardian Bank is privately held. The detailed shareholding in the bank is not widely publicly known. The bank operates as a subsidiary of Chandaria Industries Limited, a business conglomerate that is also in involved in manufacture of paper, paper products, toilet tissue, facial tissues and other paper derivatives.

Branch network
, Guardian Bank Limited maintains branches at the following locations:

 Nairobi
 Head Office - 1st & 2nd Floors, Guardian Centre, Biashara Street, Nairobi
 Biashara Street Branch - Guardian Centre, Biashara Street, Nairobi
 Mombasa Road Branch - Ground Floor, Tulip House, Nairobi
 Westlands Branch - Brick Court House, Mpaka Road, Westlands, Nairobi
 Ngong Road Branch - Ground Floor, The Greenhouse, Ngong Road, Nairobi
 Western
 Eldoret Branch - Biharilal House, Uganda Road, Eldoret
 Kisumu Branch - Ground Floor, Amalo Plaza, Oginga Odinga Road, Kisumu
 Nakuru Branch - Ground Floor, Parana House, Kenyatta Avenue, Nakuru
 Coastal
 Mombasa Branch - Oriental Building, Nkrumah Road, Mombasa
 Nyali Branch - Ground Floor, Links Plaza, Links Road, Nyali

See also
 List of banks in Kenya
 Central Bank of Kenya
 Economy of Kenya

References

External links
 
 Website of Central Bank of Kenya
 Company Profile At Businessweek.com

Banks of Kenya
Privately held companies
Banks established in 1992
Companies based in Nairobi
Kenyan companies established in 1992